World Premiere is a 1941 American comedy film directed by Ted Tetzlaff and written by Earl Felton. The film stars John Barrymore, Frances Farmer, Eugene Pallette, Virginia Dale, Ricardo Cortez, Sig Ruman and Don Castle. The film was released on August 21, 1941, by Paramount Pictures. Otis Garrett was originally scheduled to direct the film but had to pull out due to undergoing major surgery.

Plot
Hollywood producer Duncan DeGrasse (Barrymore) is preparing for the debut of his anti-Nazi motion picture, 'The Earth is in Flames.' To generate hype, his press agents create elaborate events for the premiere. One of these stunts involves hiring phony spies to make the audience think they're in real danger. However, among the fake spies are German and Italian operatives.

Cast
John Barrymore as Duncan DeGrasse
Frances Farmer as Kitty Carr
Eugene Pallette as Gregory Martin
Virginia Dale as Lee Morrisson
Ricardo Cortez as Mark Saunders
Sig Ruman as Franz von Bushmaster
Don Castle	as Joe Bemis
William Wright	as Luther Shinkley
Fritz Feld	as Field Marshal Muller
Luis Alberni as Signor Scaletti
Cliff Nazarro as Peters
Andrew Tombes as Nixon

References

External links
 

1941 films
1941 comedy films
American comedy films
Paramount Pictures films
Films directed by Ted Tetzlaff
Films produced by Sol C. Siegel
American black-and-white films
1940s English-language films
1940s American films